Tara Bohanna (born 3 March 1995) is an Australian rules footballer playing for Gold Coast in the AFL Women's (AFLW). She was appointed Gold Coast's captain in August 2022.

Career
Bohanna debuted for the Suns in round 1 of the 2022 season, having been signed as a replacement player by the club during the 2021 off-season. She played for the Southern Saints in the VFL Women's (VFLW) competition in 2019 and 2021, and took out the club's best and fairest award in the latter season. She was also the league's third-highest goalkicker in 2021 and averaged over 16 disposals and four marks a game. Following her signing by the Suns, she established herself quickly as a goal-kicking forward and was the club's highest scoring goal-kicker for the 2022 season, kicking 13 goals in 10 games.

References

External links
Gold Coast Suns profile

1995 births
Living people
Australian rules footballers from Queensland
Gold Coast Football Club (AFLW) players